Agapanthia dahli is a species of beetle in the family Cerambycidae. It was described by Richter in 1821.

References

dahli
Beetles described in 1821